Trezzo may refer to:
 Trezzo sull'Adda,  comune in the Metropolitan City of Milan in the Italian region Lombardy
 Trezzo Tinella, a comune in the Province of Cuneo in the Italian region Piedmont

See also 
 Trezzi, a surname
 Trezzano (disambiguation)